Arthur Boniface O'Brien (15 May 1878 – 31 May 1951) was a New Zealand rugby union fullback who played club rugby for Guy's Hospital. O'Brien is most notable for playing international rugby for the British Isles team on its 1904 tour of Australia, for which he was also elected team manager.

Rugby career
New Zealand born, O'Brien came to England to study medicine. While a student at Guy's Hospital, he joined the hospital rugby team. In 1904, a British Isles team was formed to tour Australia and New Zealand, and Guy's Hospital provided four members of the team. O'Brien and fellow New Zealander Pat McEvedy, were two of the medical staff chosen to represent the Lions against their home country. As well as being chosen to play, O'Brien was also given the task of managing the British team.

Of the 19 matches arranged for the tour, O'Brien played in 16 of them, and selected himself for all four Test games. His first match of the tour, against the New South Wales Waratahs, saw him score four conversions.

Place of burial
Arthur O'Brien is buried in Linwood Cemetery, Christchurch, NZ in Block 40 Plot 4.  His last known address is listed as 70 Papanui Road, Christchurch. He was aged 73.

References

1878 births
1951 deaths
British & Irish Lions rugby union players from New Zealand
Burials at Linwood Cemetery, Christchurch
New Zealand rugby union players
Rugby union fullbacks
Rugby union players from Westport, New Zealand